Prospect Point is a headland at the west extremity of Velingrad Peninsula on Graham Coast in Graham Land,  south of Ferin Head and immediately east of the Fish Islands. Roughly charted by the British Graham Land Expedition (BGLE) under Rymill, 1934–37. Photographed by Hunting Aerosurveys Ltd. in 1956–57. The name was suggested in 1957 by E. P. Arrowsmith, Governor of the Falkland Islands.

Station J
Prospect Point was the location of the British research Station J. The hut, known as Penola, was occupied from February 2, 1957 to February 23, 1959 and the researchers carried out searching in the survey and geology. The station was removed in April 2004.

See also 
 List of Antarctic and sub-Antarctic islands
 List of Antarctic research stations
 List of Antarctic field camps
 Crime in Antarctica

References

External links
 SCAR Composite Gazetteer of Antarctica

Headlands of Graham Land
Graham Coast